Emanuel "Elo" Romančík (17 December 1922 in Ružomberok – 9 October 2012 in Bratislava) was a Slovak actor. He starred in the 1970 film Witchhammer under director Otakar Vávra.

Selected filmography

 1951 Boj se skončí zítra (Jakub)
 1953 Pole neorané (Pavel Húščava)
 1953 Rodná zem (Jurek)
 1956 Prověrka lásky (Juraj Horálik)
 1957 Dovidenia Lucienne
 1959 Dům na rozcestí (MUDr. Juraj Belan)
 1959 Kapitán Dabač (Pavol Garaj)
 1960 Na pochodu se vždy nezpívá (Martin Gonda)
 1960 Tři tuny prachu (Spára)
 1961 Králíci ve vysoké trávě (otec)
 1961 Pokořené řeky (Ján Kolesár)
 1962 Půlnoční mše (dr. Harman)
 1967 Volání démonov (ředitel Černek)
 1970 Witchhammer (Lautner)
 1973 Dolina (leutnant)
 1975 Tetované časem (Popelár)
 1975 Život na útěku (mjr. Zvara)
 1977 Kamarádka Šuška (Hronec)
 1978 Poéma o svědomí (Borovský)
 1979 Smrt šitá na míru (biskup)
 1981 Pomocník (Štefan Riečan)
 1985 Skleníková Venuše (prof. Čajovec)
 1986 Šestá věta (Slančík)

References

1922 births
2012 deaths
People from Ružomberok
Slovak male film actors
Slovak male television actors
20th-century Slovak male actors
Czechoslovak male actors